Dieter Eppler (11 February 1927, in Stuttgart – 12 April 2008, in Stuttgart) was a German television actor and director of radio dramas. He was an actor, known for Jonas (1957), The Country Doctor (1987) and The Last Winter (1960). He was married to Magdalene Schnaitmann and they had five children. He was a prolific German character actor, seen in many TV crime series like Tatort, Derrick and The Old Fox. In the 1950s and 1960s, he had leading roles in several Edgar Wallace adaptations. Often portraying military types, he was noted for his starring role in U 47 – Kapitänleutnant Prien (1957). He also did horror as in the character of the evil vampire in the 1962 film Slaughter of the Vampires. He stayed in Germany and worked there and in European films until his death in 2008.

Filmography

1956: Der Hexer (TV film) as Wachtmeister Carter
1957: Jonas as M.S.
1958: The Green Devils of Monte Cassino as Karl Christiansen
1958: U 47 – Kapitänleutnant Prien as Kapitän Günther Prein
1958:  as Hans von Cleve
1959: The Head as Paul Lerner
1959: Der Frosch mit der Maske as Joshua Broad
1959:  as Ted O'Connor
1960: Under Ten Flags as Dr. Hartmann
1960: The Terrible People as Mr. Crayley
1960: The Last Winter as Oberleutnant Ahlbach
1960: Stahlnetz:  (TV series episode) as Charly Siegert
1961:  as Walter Bertram
1961: Biographie eines Schokoladentages (TV film) as Herr Stockhahn alias Herr A.T. Stickman
1962: Il segno del vendicatore
1962: Affäre Blum (TV film) as Hans Fischer
1962: Venus fra Vestø as Kaptjan Weiss
1962: Slaughter of the Vampires as The Vampire
1963: The White Spider as Summerfield
1963: The Strangler of Blackmoor Castle as Anthony, the Butler
1963: Piccadilly Zero Hour 12 as Sergeant Howard Slatterly
1964: The Secret of Dr. Mabuse as Kaspar
1964:  as Mr. Gray 
1964:  as Polizeileutenant Keller
1964: Lana, Queen of the Amazons as Giovanni di Araúza / Gerónimo de Araújo
1965: 2 Milliarden gegen die Bank von England (TV film) as SS-Sturmbannführer Addi Naumann
1965: Der unheimliche Mönch as Sir Williams
1966: I Deal in Danger as Dr. Stolnitz
1966: Die Nibelungen, Teil 1: Siegfried as Rüdiger von Bechlarn
1966: Savage Pampas as Rivera
1966: All'ombra delle aquile as Batone
1967: Die Nibelungen, Teil 2: Kriemhilds Rache as Rüdiger von Bechlarn 
1967: Lucky, the Inscrutable as Secuaz de Gafas de Oro
1967: Spy Today, Die Tomorrow as Captain Reichel
1967: The Blood Demon as The Coachman
1967: Massacre in the Black Forest
1968: Death and Diamonds as Tomasio
1968:  as Kurt von Asbach
1968: Kampf um Rom I as Thorismund
1969: Kampf um Rom II – Der Verrat as Thorismund
1969: Dead Body on Broadway as Cindy's agent (uncredited)
1970: General Oster – Verräter oder Patriot? (TV film) 
1970: Deep End as Stoker
1970: Die U-2-Affäre (TV film) as Oberst Shelton
1970: Tatort (TV Series) as Kommissar Liersdahl / Gastkommissar Liersdahl / Wilhelm Zander / Bossie / Eduard Kern
1971: Theodor Kardinal Innitzer (TV film) as Bürckl, Gauleiter
1972: Die Pueblo-Affaire (TV film) as Lacy
1972: Mit dem Strom (TV film) as Ermisch, Kriminalkommissar
1972: Life Is Tough, Eh Providence? as Sheriff Howard Pendleton
1973: Zu einem Mord gehören zwei (TV film) as Bonard
1974:  
1976: Derrick (TV Series) as Dr Schöller / Polizeeichef / Oppler / Bache / Various Characters
1976:  as Herr Gaub
1977: Halbzeit (TV film) 
1978: Grüß Gott, ich komm von drüben (TV film) as Stegmaier
1981: Goldene Zeiten (TV miniseries)
1984:  as Siegfried Dietrich
1985: Seitenstechen 
1985: Beinah Trinidad (TV film) 
1985: The Old Fox (TV) as Zeisinger / Einsatzleiter
1985: Mission Terra (TV series) 
1987: The Black Forest Clinic (TV series) 
1988: Der Schatz im Niemandsland (TV series) 
1989: Mit Leib und Seele (TV series) as Bürgermeister Rösner / Bürgermeister Rösler
1990: Abenteuer Airport (TV series) as Direktor Tiedemann
1991: Zwei Schlitzohren in Antalya (TV series) 
1991: Der Goldene Schnitt (TV film) 
1991: Bilder machen Leute (TV film)
1994: Der König von Bärenbach (TV series) 
1994:  (TV film) as Steigmaier
1999: Kanadische Träume – Eine Familie wandert aus (TV miniseries)
1999: Das verbotene Zimmer (TV film) as Kurt Krumholz
2000: Jugendsünde (TV film) as Klemm
2000: Stimme des Herzens (TV film) as Herr Heinze
2001: Alle meine Töchter (TV series) as Josef (final appearance)

External links
 
 Short Biography 

1927 births
2008 deaths
German male film actors
German male television actors
20th-century German male actors